The name Herennius may refer to:

 Herennius Pontius (fl. c. 340 BC), Samnite statesman, father of Gaius Pontius
 Marcus Herennius (consul 93 BC)
 Gaius Herennius (otherwise unknown), addressee of the book Rhetorica ad Herennium
 Marcus Herennius Picens (consul 34 BC)
 Herennius Senecio (died c. 90), Roman writer, biographer of Helvidius Priscus
 Herennius Philo, also known as Philo of Byblos (c. 64–141), scholar
 Lucius Herennius Saturninus, suffect consul in AD 100
 Publius Herennius Dexippus (c. 210–273), the Greek historian most often known as Dexippus
 Herennius (fl. c. 240), a Neoplatonic  philosopher; see Ammonius Saccas
 Herennius Modestinus (fl. c. 250), Roman jurist
 Herennius Etruscus (c. 227–251), Roman emperor

See also
 Herennia Etruscilla, the mother of Herennius Etruscus
 Herennia gens, all people who had the gentilicium Herennius in their name.